George Roberts, D.D.  was  an English priest in the  17th century.

Roberts was  born in Oxfordshire and educated at St John's College, Oxford. He held livings at Shermanbury and Hambleden. Roberts was Archdeacon of Winchester from 1660 until his death in 1661.

Notes

1661 deaths
People from Oxfordshire
Archdeacons of Winchester (ancient)
Alumni of St John's College, Oxford
People from Shermanbury
People from Hambleden